Leandro Sebastián Fernández (born 30 January 1983) is an Argentine former professional footballer who played as a defender and was part of the gold medal Argentine team at the 2004 Summer Olympics. At the Olympics he was not initially part of the squad but was called up for the gold medal game to cover for the injured Nicolás Burdisso. He also got 4th place in 2003 FIFA World Youth Championship, and was part of the Argentina squad that were runners up in the 2004 Copa América.

Fernández started his professional career at the age of 15 when he joined Newell's Old Boys. In 2005, he transferred to the River Plate.
Fernández joined Dynamo Moscow, Russian Premier League football club in 2006 and soon became one of this club fans' favorite and was voted "best Player of the Year" by Dynamo Moscow supporters.

Honours

Club
Newell's Old Boys
Argentine Primera División: Apertura 2004

International
Gold Medal at the Summer Olympics: 2004 Athens

Individual
Dynamo Moscow player of the year: 2005–06

References

External links
 
 
 
 

1983 births
Living people
Footballers from Rosario, Santa Fe
Argentine footballers
Newell's Old Boys footballers
Club Atlético River Plate footballers
FC Dynamo Moscow players
Argentina under-20 international footballers
Argentina international footballers
Footballers at the 2004 Summer Olympics
Olympic footballers of Argentina
Olympic gold medalists for Argentina
2004 Copa América players
Expatriate footballers in Russia
Argentine Primera División players
Argentine expatriate footballers
Russian Premier League players
Argentine expatriate sportspeople in Russia
Olympic medalists in football
Medalists at the 2004 Summer Olympics
Association football defenders